Sugar & Spice is a 2001 American teen black comedy film directed by Francine McDougall and starring Marley Shelton, Marla Sokoloff and Mena Suvari. The plot follows a group of high school cheerleaders who conspire and commit armed robbery when one of them becomes pregnant and desperate for money.

The film received mixed reviews from critics. It grossed a worldwide total of $16.9 million against a budget of $11 million.

Plot
The story is told by Lisa Janusch, the spiteful and jealous head cheerleader of Lincoln High School's B-squad.

Diane Weston, the popular head cheerleader of Lincoln High School's A-squad, becomes pregnant by the well-known football quarterback Jack Bartlett. The two are kicked out of their parents' homes and find an apartment of their own. Jack initially has issues keeping a job, but eventually gets hired at a video rental store. In spite of their issues coming up with the rent money, Jack and Diane try as hard as they can to survive while going to school at the same time. Lisa, Diane's spiteful rival, occasionally runs into Jack at the rental store. She is interested in winning Jack's heart, but fails to get his attention.

After struggling with the rent and anticipating the financial hardship of supporting a family, Diane and her four cheerleader squadmates, Kansas Hill, Cleo Miller, Lucy Whitmore, and Hannah Wald, plan the perfect bank robbery. They promise each other not to tell Jack about their plan, due to his inability to lie to others.

The squad watches heist films to learn how to rob banks, and Kansas visits her mother at the women's penitentiary for tips on where to find weaponry. Following the women's advice, Diane and her friends visit a bug exterminator, Hank "The Terminator" Rogers, who sells illegal arms and ammo. After failing to negotiate on prices, Hank offers to give them the guns for free on the condition that they befriend his socially awkward daughter, Fern, and put her on their squad.

The squad reluctantly accepts Fern into their circle, and they all begin rehearsing the robbery, as well as their choreography for the winter ball. During winter break, they order doll masks to hide their identities. Lucy backs out of the heist because she receives a scholarship to Harvard. At Christmas, Diane receives an engagement ring from Jack. She then learns he sold his GTO in order to buy her the ring. The squad is forced to obtain a new getaway vehicle, prompting Fern to volunteer her father's work van with bad brakes.

At their first robbery at a supermarket, Lucy returns to the group having decided to help them after all. Lisa happens to be in the store at the time of the robbery, and notices that they perform cheerleader stunts in order to cover up the security cameras. The squad robs the bank and come close to shooting a customer after one of the guns discharges. They make off with armloads of cash and honor their success after burning their costumes. The robbery is widely reported in the media. Neither Diane nor her friends expect Lisa to suspect them until they are confronted by her and the B-squad in the high school cafeteria, followed by the FBI.

Diane and her friends are arrested and need an alibi, so Diane promises to promote Lisa to captain of the A-squad in order to keep Lisa silent, since she is approaching her third trimester and cannot do meticulous activity. The group is outraged, but come to appreciate the decision. In order to cover up her actions, Diane tells Jack she won the lottery and after they have their twins, Jack wins his senatorial campaign, and Diane's squad lead successful lives after high school.

Cast

Production
The film was loosely based on a 1999 series of robberies perpetrated by four teenage girls from the Kingwood area of Houston, Texas. Sokoloff stated, "It's not the same, of course, yet I'm not sure if Sugar & Spice would have been made if that hadn't happened."

The film was originally titled Sugar & Spice & Semi-automatics, but the title was changed and the script was toned down following the Columbine High School massacre. The film changed so much from the original that Lona Williams had her name removed from the film and the writing was instead credited to the pseudonym Mandy Nelson.

Casting for the film coincided with the casting of another film about cheerleaders, Bring It On. 17 years later, actress Gabrielle Union claimed that she and many of her Bring It On co-stars auditioned for Sugar & Spice, with the latter seen as the more desirable project. "Bring It On was the cheerleading movie that was the consolation prize because you didn't get the cheerleading movie that you wanted", she said.

Reception

Critical response
On Rotten Tomatoes it has an approval rating of 28% based on reviews from 75 critics, with the site's consensus "Though this cheerleader comedy has an intriguing premise, it's too empty-headed and saddled with too many lame jokes to live up to it. Also, some critics say the movie is irresponsible in its depiction of teens and guns." On Metacritic the film has a weighted average score of 48% based on reviews from 17 critics. Audiences polled by CinemaScore gave the film an average grade of "D+" on an A+ to F scale.

Roger Ebert gave the film 3 out of 4 stars, and wrote: "It's not a great high school movie like Election, but it's alive and risky and saucy."
Brendan Kelly of Variety gave the film a positive review, calling it "[q]uite a smart little film with a surprising satirical edge." 
Lisa Schwarzbaum of Entertainment Weekly gave the film a B grade, and wrote: "It's fun in its raunchy unwieldiness."

Peter Travers at Rolling Stone compared the film unfavorably to Bring It On, saying it was "not in the same clever league" and is critical that Suvari is underused, and that the gags are "scattershot at best".
Bruce Westbrook of the Houston Chronicle wrote, "The actors didn't seem worried by taking a comic approach to teen crime."

Box office
The film opened at number five at the North American box office, earning $5,891,176 USD in its opening weekend. By the end of its run, it had grossed $13,305,101 in the domestic box office and $16,908,947 worldwide; based on a $11 million budget, the film might have made small profit.

Soundtrack

 "Girls" by Lefty
 "Rock and Roll Part 2" by Gary Glitter
 "Blitzkrieg Bop" by The Nutley Brass
 "Glockenpop" by Spiderbait
 "Critical Nature" by The Dragonflies
 "Ready to Go" by Republica
 "Girl Power" by Shampoo
 "Bohemian Like You" by The Dandy Warhols
 "Watch Her Now" by Mark Mothersbaugh
 "She's So Huge" by The Flys
 "Feliz Navidad" by José Feliciano
 "Shazam" by Spiderbait
 "Cannonball" by The Breeders
 "News Flash" by Shampoo
 "B'cos We Rock" by Brassy
 "Pistolero" by Juno Reactor
 "American Girl" by Cindy Alexander
 "Let's Rob a Bank" by Size 14

References

External links
 
 
 
 
 

2001 black comedy films
2001 directorial debut films
2001 films
2000s crime comedy films
2000s English-language films
2000s heist films
2000s high school films
2000s teen comedy films
American black comedy films
American crime comedy films
American heist films
American high school films
American pregnancy films
American teen comedy films
Cheerleading films
Comedy films based on actual events
Crime films based on actual events
Films directed by Francine McDougall
Films scored by Mark Mothersbaugh
Films shot in Minnesota
New Line Cinema films
Teen crime films
Teenage pregnancy in film
American female buddy films
2000s female buddy films
2000s American films